The Laurie O'Reilly Cup is the trophy competed for by the women's rugby union teams of Australia and New Zealand. The two nations met annually between 1994 and 1998, with New Zealand winning all games, often by significant margins, as a result of which the series fell into abeyance, but was revived in 2007.

History
The Cup is named in honour of Laurie O’Reilly, New Zealand's first women's Selector and National coach who died in 1998. It was formerly known as the Laurie O'Reilly Memorial Trophy. It has been contested between New Zealand and Australia since its inception in 1994. The Black Ferns has won every fixture so far and are the current holders of the O’Reilly Cup with a total of 17 wins.

In 2018, the Black Ferns and the Wallaroos played both Tests as curtain-raisers to both Bledisloe Cup Tests in Sydney and Auckland. The crowd at the end of both women's Tests swelled to about 28,000. The women's double-header concept was deemed as a success by NZR CEO Steve Tew who is open to repeating the concept. For the equivalent match at Eden Park in 2016, also before the men's clash, the crowd size peaked at 12,500.

In 2020, All planned test matches for the Wallaroos were cancelled due to impacts of the COVID-19 pandemic, as was the September tour to New Zealand in 2021.

After a two year absence due to the pandemic, it was confirmed that the competition would return. The Black Ferns hosted the first test and the Wallaroos the second test. The second match was played as a curtain raiser to the Wallabies and Springboks test in Adelaide. The Black Ferns won the first test in Christchurch and retained the O'Reilly Cup. They then won the series after winning the second test.

Results

Matches

See also

Women's international rugby union
Australia–New Zealand sports rivalries
Bledisloe Cup
Rugby union trophies and awards

References

International women's rugby union competitions hosted by Australia
International women's rugby union competitions hosted by New Zealand
Recurring sporting events established in 1994
Australia women's national rugby union team
New Zealand women's national rugby union team
Rugby union international rivalry trophies
1994 establishments in Australia
1994 establishments in New Zealand
 
Women's rugby union competitions in Oceania for national teams